
Year 1565 (MDLXV) was a common year starting on Monday (link will display the full calendar) of the Julian calendar.

Events 
 January–June 

 January 3 – In the Tsardom of Russia, Ivan the Terrible originates the oprichnina (repression of the boyars (aristocrats)).
 January 23 – Battle of Talikota: The Vijayanagara Empire, the last Hindu kingdom in South India, is greatly weakened by the Deccan sultanates.
 February 13 – Spanish Conquistador Miguel López de Legazpi lands with his troops on the shores of Cebu Island in the Philippines.
 March 1 – The city of Rio de Janeiro, Brazil, is founded as São Sebastião do Rio de Janeiro by Estácio de Sá.
 March 16 – Spanish Conquistador López de Legazpi makes a blood compact (sandugan) with Datu Sikatuna in the island of Bohol, Philippines.
 April 27 – Cebu City is established as San Miguel by López de Legazpi, becoming the first Spanish settlement in the Philippines.
 May 18 – Ottoman troops land on the island of Malta, beginning the Great Siege of Malta.
 June 4 – The Treaty of Cebu is signed between Miguel López de Legazpi, representing Philip II of Spain, and Rajah Tupas of Cebu. This effectively creates Spanish suzerainty over Cebu.
 June 17 – Matsunaga Hisahide assassinates the 13th Ashikaga shogun, Ashikaga Yoshiteru.

 July–December 
 July 29 – The widowed Mary, Queen of Scots, marries her half-cousin Henry Stuart, Lord Darnley, at Holyrood Palace in Edinburgh.
 August 6 – Sark, in the Channel Islands, is granted as a fief by Elizabeth I of England to Hellier de Carteret, Seigneur of Saint Ouen.
 August 28 (feast day of St. Augustine) – The Spanish fleet of Pedro Menéndez de Avilés first sights land in Florida.
 September 4 – The Spanish fleet of Pedro Menéndez de Avilés lands in Florida to oust the French under Jean Ribault. He later destroys the French colony of Fort Caroline.
 September 8 – St. Augustine, Florida (named after Augustine of Hippo), is established by Pedro Menéndez de Avilés, becoming the oldest surviving European settlement in the modern-day United States.
 September 11 – The Knights of Malta lift the Great Siege of Malta after four months.
 October – The first Martello tower, the Tour de Mortella, designed by Giovan Giacomo Paleari Fratino (el Fratin), is completed as part of the Genovese defence system at Mortella (Myrtle) Point, in Upper Corsica.
 October 18 – Battle of Fukuda Bay: Ships belonging to the Matsura clan of Japan fail to capture a Portuguese trading carrack, in the first recorded naval battle between Japan and the West.

 Date unknown 
 The pencil is first documented by Conrad Gesner; it is becoming common in England.
 John Beddoes School is founded at Presteigne, Wales.
 Herlufsholm School is founded in Denmark.
 Huntingdon Grammar School is established in England.
 Bungay Grammar School is established in England.

Births 

 January 17 – Mariana Navarro de Guevarra Romero, Spanish Roman Catholic nun, member of the Mercedarian Tertiaries (d. 1624)
 February 13 – Willem Baudartius, Dutch theologian (d. 1640)
 March 23 – Eilhard Lubinus, German theologian (d. 1621)
 April 2 – Cornelis de Houtman, Dutch explorer (d. 1599)
 April 3 – Anna III, Abbess of Quedlinburg (d. 1601)
 May 15 – Hendrick de Keyser, Dutch sculptor and architect born in Utrecht (d. 1621)
 June 2 – Francisco Ribalta, Spanish painter (d. 1628)
 July 6 – Hugh Hamersley, Lord Mayor of London, 1627–1628 (d. 1636)
 August 5 - Paola Massarenghi, Italian composer (d. unknown)
 August 9 – Louis II, Count of Nassau-Weilburg (d. 1627)
 August 16 – Christina, Grand Duchess of Tuscany (d. 1637)
 August 20 – Margaretha van Valckenburch, Dutch shipowner, only female member of the VOC (d. 1650) 
 August 29 – Agostino Ciampelli, Italian painter (d. 1630)
 September 17 – Edward Fortunatus, German nobleman (d. 1600)
 September 28 – Alessandro Tassoni, Italian poet and writer (d. 1635)
 October 6 – Marie de Gournay, French writer (d. 1645)
 October 12 – Ippolito Galantini, Italian founder of the Congregation of Christian Doctrine of Florence (d. 1619)
 October 22 – Benedikt Carpzov the elder, German legal scholar (d. 1624)
 November 10
 Robert Devereux, 2nd Earl of Essex, English nobleman and politician (d. 1601)
 Laurentius Paulinus Gothus, Swedish theologian and astronomer (d. 1646)
 November 14 – Petrus Bertius, Flemish theologian and scientist (d. 1629)
 December 2 – Toby Caulfeild, 1st Baron Caulfeild, Northern Irish politician (d. 1627)
 date unknown
 Reza Abbasi, Persian painter and calligrapher (d. 1635)
 Gregor Aichinger, German composer (d. 1628)
 Ferdinando Gorges, English colonial entrepreneur (d. 1647)
 John Davies of Hereford, Welsh poet (d. 1618)
 George Kirbye, English composer (d. 1634)
 Duarte Lobo, Portuguese composer (d. 1646)
 Francis Meres, English churchman and author (d. 1647)
 María Pita, Spanish heroine (d. 1643)
 John Spottiswoode, Archbishop of St. Andrews (d. 1639)
 Francis Tanfield, English governor of the South Falkland colony
 Edmund Whitelocke, English soldier and courtier (d. 1608)

Deaths 

 January 19 – Diego Laynez, Spanish Jesuit theologian (b. 1512)
 January 28 – Francisco Cesi, Italian Catholic cardinal (b. 1500)
 February 28 – John, Duke of Münsterberg-Oels and Count of Glatz (b. 1509)
 March 17 – Alexander Ales, Scottish theologian (b. 1500)
 c. March – Lope de Rueda, Spanish dramatist (b. c. 1510)
 April 2 – Elisabeth Parr, Marchioness of Northampton, English noble (b. 1526)
 April 27 – Osanna of Cattaro, Dominican visionary and anchoress (b. 1493)
 May 14 – Nicolaus von Amsdorf, German Protestant reformer (b. 1483)
 May 5 – Queen Munjeong, Korean queen (b. 1501)
 May 28 – Mikołaj "the Black" Radziwiłł, Polish magnate (b. 1515)
 June 12 – Adrianus Turnebus, French classical scholar (b. 1512)
 June 17 – Ashikaga Yoshiteru, Japanese shogun (b. 1536)
 June 19 – Wolfgang Lazius, Austrian historian (b. 1514)
 June 23 – Turgut Reis, Ottoman naval commander (b. 1485)
 July 18 – Kat Ashley, governess of Elizabeth I of England
 August – Jacques Buus, Flemish composer and organist (b. 1500)
 August 29 – Alfonso Carafa, Italian cardinal (b. 1540)
 June 25 – Herluf Trolle, Danish Admiral of the Fleet and co-founder of Herlufsholm School (b. 1516)
 September 13 – William Farel, French evangelist (b. 1489)
 September 20 – Cipriano de Rore, Flemish composer and teacher (b. 1515)
 October 4 – Pier Paolo Vergerio, Italian reformer (b. 1498)
 October 5 – Lodovico Ferrari, Italian mathematician (b. 1522)
 October 7 – Johannes Mathesius, German theologian (b. 1504)
 October 12 – Jean Ribault, French explorer and colonizer (b. 1520)
 October 14 – Thomas Chaloner, English statesman and poet (b. 1521)
 October 21 – John Frederick III, Duke of Saxony and nominal Duke of Saxe-Gotha (b. 1538)
 October 22 – Jean, Vicomte d'Aguisy Grolier de Servieres, French bibliophile (b. 1479)
 October 29 – Ranuccio Farnese, Italian prelate (b. 1530)
 November 2 – Mechthild of Bavaria, German duchess (b. 1532)
 November 25 – Hu Zongxian, Chinese general (b. 1512)
 December 9 – Pope Pius IV (b. 1499)
 December 12 – Johan Rantzau, German general (b. 1492)
 December 13 – Conrad Gessner, Swiss naturalist (b. 1516)
 date unknown
 Antonio Bernieri, Italian painter of the Renaissance period (b. 1516) 
 Yadegar Mokhammad of Kazan, last khan of Kazan Khanate
 Paweł Tarło, canon of Kraków, Poland

References